Gerhardus Hermanus Hendrikus 'Gerrie' Sonnekus  (born 1 February 1953) is a former South African rugby union player.

Playing career
Sonnekus finished his schooling in Welkom and studied at the University of the Free State. He played his first provincial match for the Free State in 1974 and continued to represent the union until 1985. During his career with the Free State he played in five Currie Cup finals, being on the losing side in 1975, 1977, 1978 and 1981. In 1976 he was a member of the Free State team that won the Currie Cup final against Western Province and gained is winners medal when he went on as a replacement for Eben Jansen during the match. With his retirement at the end of the 1985 season, Sonnekus was the Free State record holder for most matches of 160, most matches as captain of 63, most tries of 69 and most Currie Cup matches of 104.

Sonnekus played three test matches for the Springboks. His first test was the third tests in the series  against the 1974 Lions team captained by Willie John McBride, played at the Boet Erasmus Stadium in Port Elizabeth, when he was selected as scrumhalf. His second test match was almost ten years later, once again at the Boet Erasmus Stadium, this time as number 8 against England. He then played in the second test against the English, at Ellis Park and scores his first test try during the match.

Test history

Accolades
Sonnekus was one of the five nominees for 1985 SA Rugby player of the Year award. The other nominees for the award were Jannie Breedt, Schalk Burger Snr., Danie Gerber and the eventual winner of the award, Naas Botha.

See also
List of South Africa national rugby union players – Springbok no.  473

References

1953 births
Living people
South African rugby union players
South Africa international rugby union players
Free State Cheetahs players
People from Setsoto Local Municipality
Rugby union players from the Free State (province)
Rugby union number eights